Johan Christian Strøm (born 14 June 1947) is a Norwegian luger. He was born in Oslo, and is the brother of Rolf Greger Strøm. He competed in at the 1972 Winter Olympics in Sapporo, where he placed 14th in singles, and 14th in doubles together with Stephen Sinding.

References

External links

1947 births
Living people
Sportspeople from Oslo
Norwegian male lugers
Olympic lugers of Norway
Lugers at the 1972 Winter Olympics
Lugers at the 1976 Winter Olympics